"The Dangling Conversation" is a song by American music duo Simon & Garfunkel, released in September 1966 as the second single from the duo's third studio album, Parsley, Sage, Rosemary and Thyme (1966).

Background
Simon & Garfunkel's opinion of the song varied over time. According to biographer Peter Ames Carlin, they both considered it their favorite song on the album at the time of its release. Marc Eliot, who wrote Paul Simon: A Life, disputes this, arguing that Garfunkel always disliked the song and felt it was pretentious. When the single did not perform as well as they had hoped, Simon told Record Mirror's Norman Jopling that the song was "above the kids." In 1993, when asked about the song, he commented, "It's a college kid's song, a little precious."

Reception
Cash Box said that it is a "gentle pop-folk ode which underscores some of life’s everyday hypocrisies" and expected it to "become a smash."

Commercial performance
The song peaked at number 25 on the Billboard Hot 100, and never made it onto the UK charts. Simon viewed "The Dangling Conversation" as an "absolutely amazing" disappointment to him at the time, as the previous three Simon & Garfunkel singles were reasonable "hits". He felt as though the song may have been "too heavy" for a mainstream audience.

Charts

Notes

References

Sources 

 
 

Simon & Garfunkel songs
Songs written by Paul Simon
1966 singles
Song recordings produced by Bob Johnston
Columbia Records singles
1966 songs